Mohammad Ali ( – 3 October 2012) was a Bangladeshi physician and politician from Netrokona belonging to Bangladesh Nationalist Party. He was a member of the Jatiya Sangsad.

Biography
Ali was elected as a member of the Jatiya Sangsad from Mymensingh With Netrokona constituency in the Sixth General Election of Bangladesh. He was also elected from that constituency in the Seventh Jatiya Sangsad Election. He was elected from that constituency in 2001 too.

Ali was married to Rabeya Ali. They had two sons and two daughters.

Ali died on 3 October 2012 at Apollo Hospital, Dhaka at the age of 70.

References

1940s births
2012 deaths
Bangladeshi physicians
6th Jatiya Sangsad members
7th Jatiya Sangsad members
8th Jatiya Sangsad members
People from Netrokona District
Bangladesh Nationalist Party politicians